The 1923 Georgetown Blue and Gray football team represented Georgetown University during the 1923 college football season. Led by Jackie Maloney in his first and only year as head coach, the team went 3–6.

Schedule

References

Georgetown
Georgetown Hoyas football seasons
Georgetown Blue and Gray football